Ismail Ali Abokor was  a Somali Politician and Major General. A senior member of the Supreme Revolutionary Council, He also served as Vice President of Somalia  in the era of Siad Barre between 1971 and 1982. He was also a Speaker of parliament 1979 – 1982.

Early life and education
Abokor was born in 1937 in Burao, now Somaliland. After completing his secondary education, he traveled to England for military training. He graduated from the Royal Military Academy Sandhurst.

Career

Early career
Ismail Ali Abokor returned to Somalia in 1960 as one of the first officers to train for British Somaliland. In 1961, Obokor became deputy commander of the officers training school.

In 1962, he served as the head of the Somali National Army Barue, and in 1963 was named as a deputy commander of a battalion stationed in Kismayo.
In 1965, he trained in Mogadishu, and after that he was appointed as a commander of a battalion in Kismayo, and was promoted to a rank of lieutenant.

In 1967 he became Chief of trainers at Halane training school, known as "Bootiko".

Somali Democratic Republic
Ismail Ali Abukar served in the Somali National Army. In the rank of lieutenant colonel participated in the coup d'état of October 21, 1969, which led to the rule of General Mohammed Siad Barre, and became a member of the Supreme Revolutionary Council of the Somali Democratic Republic.

He held the post of one of the vice-presidents of the Somali Democratic Republic, received the rank of colonel.

In November 1971 he visited the USSR. He was one of the key figures of the regime of Siad Barre, he held the rank of brigadier general and in 1971 he was appointed the Vice President of Somalia. Since July 1976 (from the date of founding the party) he became a member of the Central Committee and a member of the Politburo of the Somali Revolutionary Socialist Party.

Defection 
After falling out with Barre, he was imprisoned in 1982 and subsequently released in 1988, after which he defected to the Somali National Movement based in what was then northern Somalia.

References

1937 births
Living people
Vice presidents of Somalia
Speakers of the Parliament of Somalia
Somali Revolutionary Socialist Party politicians